Priscu Valley is an upland ice-free valley on the east side of Prentice Plateau in Antarctica's Olympus Range. The valley opens north to the head of McKelvey Valley. Named by Advisory Committee on Antarctic Names (US-ACAN) (2004) after John C. Priscu, Department of Biological Sciences, Montana State University, Bozeman, Montana; United States Antarctic Program (USAP) investigator in the McMurdo Dry Valleys, 1984–2002.

Valleys of Victoria Land
McMurdo Dry Valleys